Dave Maxey (born 1973) is an American marketing professional and Republican politician. He is a member of the Wisconsin State Assembly, representing Wisconsin's 15th Assembly district since January 2023.

Biography
Dave Maxey was born in Wisconsin and graduated from Brookfield East High School in 1991 and enlisted in the United States Navy.  After his term of enlistment, he attended Waukesha County Technical College and earned an associate degree in marketing.

Political career
In 2003, he moved to New Berlin, Wisconsin, where he has since resided.  In 2008, he ran for and was elected to the New Berlin Board of Education.  He served nine years on the board, including six as president. He was subsequently elected to the New Berlin city council in 2017.

In April 2022, incumbent Wisconsin state representative Joe Sanfelippo announced he would not seek another term and would retire at the end of the 105th Wisconsin Legislature.  That same day, Maxey announced his candidacy for the 15th Assembly district seat. After his prompt announcement, no other candidate chose to enter the race and Maxey faced no opponent in the primary or general election in 2022.  He will take office in January 2023.

Personal life and family
Dave Maxey lives with his wife, Tracy, and their three children in New Berlin, Wisconsin.

References

External links
 Campaign website
 Dave Maxey at Wisconsin Vote
 

1973 births
Living people
Waukesha County Technical College alumni
Republican Party members of the Wisconsin State Assembly
People from Brookfield, Wisconsin
People from New Berlin, Wisconsin
21st-century American politicians
United States Navy sailors